Ted Lasso is an American sports comedy-drama television series developed by Jason Sudeikis, Bill Lawrence, Brendan Hunt, and Joe Kelly. The series is based on the character played by Sudeikis in a series of NBC Sports promotional videos. The first season, consisting of 10 episodes, was broadcast on Apple TV+ from August 14 to October 2, 2020. The 12-episode second season aired from July 23 to October 8, 2021. Apple renewed the series for a third season in October 2020.

For its first season, Ted Lasso was nominated for 20 Primetime Emmy Awards, winning seven including Outstanding Comedy Series and Outstanding Lead Actor in a Comedy Series for Sudeikis. The show has also received a Producers Guild of America Award, three Screen Actors Guild Awards, and two Writers Guild of America Awards, as well as nominations for five Directors Guild of America Awards. From critics' groups, the series has received two Golden Globe Awards, seven Critics' Choice Television Awards, and three TCA Awards.

Awards and nominations

Notes

References

External links 
 

Ted Lasso
Ted Lasso